NDCC may refer to:

 National Defense Cadet Corps
 National Disaster Risk Reduction and Management Council (formerly National Disaster Coordinating Council)
 Non-dihydropyridine calcium channel blocker, a subclass of Calcium channel blockers